Guegneka is a commune in the Cercle of Dioïla in the Koulikoro Region of south-western Mali. The principal town lies at Fana. As of 1998 the commune had a population of 25631.

References

Communes of Koulikoro Region